The 1989 BC Lions finished in fourth place in the West Division with a 7–11 record and failed to make to playoffs.

Offseason

CFL Draft

Preseason

Regular season

Season standings

Season schedule

Awards and records
CFLPA's Most Outstanding Community Service Award – Matt Dunigan (QB)
Matt Dunigan, CFL passing leader (331-for-597 for 4,509 yards)

1989 CFL All-Stars
None

References

BC Lions seasons
1989 Canadian Football League season by team
1989 in British Columbia